John Russell (September 7, 1772 – August 2, 1842) was an American doctor, merchant and a United States representative from New York.

Early life
Russell was born in Branford in the Connecticut Colony on September 7, 1772. He was the second son of Federalist New York State Senator and Assemblyman Ebenezer Russell and Elizabeth (née Stork) Russell (a daughter of Capt. Moses Stork). His paternal grandparents were Mary (née Barker) Russell and John Russell.

He attended the public school, moved to New York State, studied medicine, and practiced a short time in Cooperstown, New York.

Career
He was county clerk of Otsego County from 1801 to 1804, and was elected as a Democratic-Republican to the Ninth and Tenth Congresses, holding office from March 4, 1805 to March 3, 1809.  While in Congress, Russell missed 53 of 393 roll call votes.

After he left Congress, he was a presidential elector on the DeWitt Clinton ticket in 1812. He engaged in mercantile pursuits.

Personal life
Russell was married to Elizabeth Williams (1769–1838), daughter of Rensselaer Williams, a Justice of the Peace who was the librarian of the Trenton Library Company and was one of the founders of the Trenton Academy. Together, they were the parents of:

 Rensselaer William Russell (1803–1825), who attended the Schenectady Academy (today known as Union College) where he was a member of the Philomathean Society.
 Catharine Ann Russell (1805–1875), who married, as his second wife, United States Supreme Court Justice Samuel Nelson (1792–1873) in 1825.

His wife died on December 25, 1838. He died in Cooperstown on August 2, 1842. His interment was located at its Christ Episcopal Churchyard.

Descendants
Through his daughter Catharine, he was a grandfather of six, including Rensselaer Russell Nelson (1826–1904), a United States district judge of the United States District Court for the District of Minnesota.

References

External links

Portrait of Catherine Ann Russell Nelson (1798–1875) by Samuel F. B. Morse at the Fenimore Art Museum.

1772 births
1842 deaths
19th-century American politicians
People from Branford, Connecticut
People from Cooperstown, New York
Physicians from New York (state)
1812 United States presidential electors
Democratic-Republican Party members of the United States House of Representatives from New York (state)